Lewis Richardson may refer to:
Lewis Fry Richardson (1881–1953), English mathematician and meteorologist
Lewis Richardson (boxer) (born 1997), English boxer
Lewis Richardson (footballer) (born 2003), English footballer
Lewis Richardson (Hollyoaks), fictional character from British soap opera Hollyoaks